Guatemala is mountainous, except for the south coastal area and the vast northern lowlands of Petén department. The country is located in Central America and bounded to the north and west by Mexico, to the northeast by Belize and by the Gulf of Honduras, to the east by Honduras, to the southeast by El Salvador, and to the south by the Pacific Ocean. Two mountain chains enter Guatemala from west to east, dividing the country into three major regions: the highlands, where the mountains are located; the Pacific coast, south of the mountains; and the limestone plateau of the Petén region, north of the mountains. These areas vary in climate, elevation, and landscape, providing dramatic contrasts between hot and humid tropical lowlands and highland peaks and valleys.

Regions

The southern edge of the western highlands is marked by the Sierra Madre, which stretches from the Mexican border south and east, and continues at lower elevations toward El Salvador. The mountain chain is characterized by steep volcanic cones, including Tajumulco Volcano , the highest point in the country and Central America. All of Guatemala's 37 volcanoes (3 of them active: Pacaya, Santiaguito and Fuego), are in this mountain chain, and are abundant in the highlands.

The northern chain of mountains begins near the Mexican border with the Cuchumatanes range, then stretches east through the Chuacús and Chamá sierras, down to the Santa Cruz and Minas sierras, near the Caribbean Sea. The northern and southern mountains are separated by the Motagua valley, where the Motagua river and its tributaries drains from the highlands into the Caribbean being navigable in its lower end, where it forms the boundary with Honduras.

The rivers are short and shallow in the Pacific vertient, larger and deeper, such as the Polochic which drains in Lake Izabal, Río Dulce, Motagua and Sarstún that forms the boundary with Belize in the Caribbean and the Gulf of Mexico vertient (Usumacinta, which forms the boundary between Chiapas, Mexico and Petén and its tributaries such as La Pasión and San Pedro.

Most of the major cities are located in the Highlands. Major cities are the capital Guatemala City, elevation 1,500 m (Central Highlands), Antigua Guatemala, elevation 1,530 m (Central Highlands), Quetzaltenango elevation 2,350 m (Western Highlands) and Puerto Barrios on the Caribbean coast. The largest lake Lago de Izabal (589.6 km²), is close to the Caribbean coast. Volcán Tajumulco, 4,220 m, the highest point in Central America, is located in the western department of San Marcos.

The last major earthquake was on February 4, 1976, killing more than 23,000 in the Central Highlands.

Climate 
Climate is hot and humid in the Pacific and Petén Lowlands. It is more temperate in the highlands, to freezing cold at the high of the Cuchumatanes range, and hot/drier in the easternmost departments.

Guatemala's location on the Caribbean Sea and Pacific Ocean makes it a target for hurricanes, including Hurricane Mitch in 1998 and Hurricane Stan in October 2005, which killed more than 1,500 people. The damage was not wind related, but caused by flooding and landslides.

Climate change

Geographic data

 
 Geographic coordinates
 
 Map references
 Central America and the Caribbean
 Area
 Total: 108,889 km²
 Land: 107,159 km²
 Land boundaries
 Total: 1,667 km
 Border countries: Belize 266 km, El Salvador 199 km, Honduras 244 km, Mexico 958 km
 Coastline
 400 km
 Maritime claims
 Territorial sea: 
 Exclusive economic zone:  and 
 Continental shelf: 200 m depth or to the depth of exploitation
 Extreme points
 Northernmost point – border with Mexico, Petén Department
 Southernmost point – border with El Salvador, near Garita Chapina, Jutiapa Department
 Westernmost point – border with Mexico on Pacific coast, San Marcos Department
 Easternmost point – border with Honduras, Izabal Department
 Lowest point – Pacific Ocean and Caribbean Sea: 0 m
 Highest point – Volcán Tajumulco: 4,220 m
 Natural resources
 Petroleum, nickel, rare woods, fish, chicle, hydropower
 Land use
 Arable land: 14.32%
 Permanent crops: 8.82%
 Other: 76.87% (2012 est.)
 Irrigated land
 3,121 km² (2003)
 Total renewable water resources
 111.3 km3 (2011)
 Freshwater withdrawal (domestic/industrial/agricultural)
 total: 3.46 km3/yr (15%/31%/54%)
 per capita: 259.1 m3/yr (2006)
 Natural hazards
 Several active volcanoes, occasional violent earthquakes; Caribbean coast subject to hurricanes and other tropical storms, causing flooding, mudflows and landslides
 Environment—current issues
 Deforestation; soil erosion; water pollution
 Environment—international agreements
 Party to: Antarctic Treaty, Biodiversity, Climate Change, Climate Change-Kyoto Protocol, Desertification, Endangered Species, Environmental Modification, Hazardous Wastes, Law of the Sea, Marine Dumping, Nuclear Test Ban, Ozone Layer Protection, Ship Pollution (MARPOL 73/78), Wetlands
 Signed, but not ratified: Antarctic-Environmental Protocol
 Geography—note
 No natural harbors on west coast

See also
 Guatemala Biodiversity
 List of earthquakes in Guatemala
 List of national parks of Guatemala
 List of places in Guatemala
 List of rivers of Guatemala
 List of volcanoes in Guatemala
 Water resources management in Guatemala

References